Gonsales as a last name is a Portuguese variation of the Spanish surname González/Gonzales and means 'son of Gonsalo'.

People with the surname

 Domingo Gonsales, the pseudonym of author Francis Godwin (1562–1633) with his work The Man in the Moone
 Francisco Rebolo Gonsales (1902–1980), Brazilian painter
 Pablo Gonsales, past member of the band Cymande

Fictional characters
 Police Lt. Edgar "Blackie" Gonsales, character in Tension played by William Conrad

See also 
 Gonçalves, Portuguese equivalent of Gonzalez
 Gonsalves, English language variation of Gonçalves
 Gonzalez (disambiguation)
 Gonzales (disambiguation), Spanish variation of Gonzalez
 Saint Gonsalo Garcia (1556–1597)